John Sherwood Seedborg (January 23, 1943 – December 14, 2018) was an American football guard and kicker in the National Football League for the Washington Redskins.  He played college football at Arizona State University and was drafted in the nineteenth round of the 1964 NFL Draft.

References

American football offensive guards
American football placekickers
Players of American football from California
1943 births
2018 deaths
People from Paso Robles, California
Arizona State Sun Devils football players
Washington Redskins players
Portland Loggers players